Salt Lake Stadium metro station (also known as IFA Salt Lake Stadium metro station) is a station of Kolkata Metro Line 2. It serves the Vivekananda Yuba Bharati Krirangan and Kadapara area. The station is situated over EM Bypass, 800 m away from the Bengal Chemical metro station.

The station 
This is the last elevated station on this Line. After this, the line bends almost 90° and enters into the tunnel beside Subhash Sarovar.

Layout

References 

Kolkata Metro stations